Du Burns may refer to:

Clarence H. Burns, first African-American Mayor of Baltimore City
Clarence H. "Du" Burns Arena, An arena named after Mayor Clarence H. Burns